Kwaku, alternatively Kweku, is an Ashanti given name to Ashanti male children born on Wednesday from the Ashanti people ethnic group.

Kwaku and Kweku may refer to:

People

Kwaku 
 Kwaku Alston, American photographer
 Kwaku Bediako (born 1986), Ghanaian fashion designer 
 Kwaku Boateng (athlete) (born 1974), Canadian high jumper
 Kwaku Boateng (politician) (died 2006), cabinet minister in Ghana in the early 1960s
 Kwaku Dua I Panyin, or Barima Fredua Agyeman, (c. 1797–1867), eighth King of the Ashanti Empire from 1834 until death in 1867
 Kwaku Dua III Asamu or Prempeh I (1870–1931), thirteenth King of the Ashanti Empire from 1888 until his death in 1931
 Kwaku Fortune, Irish actor
 Kwaku Gyasi, Ghanaian gospel singer
 Kwaku Kwarteng (born 1969), Ghanaian civil engineer, economist, and politician
 Kwaku Sakyi-Addo, Ghanaian journalist
 Kwaku Sintim-Misa aka KSM (born 1956), Ghanaian actor, director, satirist, talk show host and author
 Quock Walker (1753-after 1781), also called Kwaku, American slave of Ghanaian descent
 Kwaku Walker Lewis (1798–1856), African-American abolitionist and active member of the Underground Railroad and the anti-slavery movement

Middle name 

 B. Kwaku Duren (born 1943); aka Robert Donaldson Duren and Bob D. Duren, controversial African American lawyer, educator, writer, editor, Black Panther, long-time social, political and community activist
 Edward Kwaku Utuka, major general of the Ghana Armed Forces
 Manfo Kwaku Asiedu, suspect in the investigation into the 21 July 2005 London bombings
 Nana Kwaku Bonsam (born 1973), Ghanaian witch doctor and fetish priest
 Papa Kwaku Oppong (born 1987), Canadian basketball player
 Rebop Kwaku Baah, (1944–1983), Ghanaian percussionist best known for working with the 1970s rock groups Traffic and Can
 Thomas Kwaku Mensah (1935–2016), Roman Catholic archbishop of the Archdiocese of Kumasi, Ghana

Kweku 

 Kweku Adoboli (born 1980), Ghanaian ex-trader known for his role in the 2011 UBS rogue trader scandal and convicted of fraud in 2012
Chief Kweku Andoh (1836–1898), military officer in the British army and Regent of Edina State (1873-1898)
 Kweku Baako Jnr, Ghanaian journalist and editor
 Kweku Essien (born 1984), Ghanaian football (soccer) player
 Philip Quaque (1741–1816), birth name Kweku, first African ordained in the Church of England

Literature 

 Kwaku; or, the Man Who Could Not Keep His Mouth Shut, a 1982 novel by Guyanese writer Roy A. K. Heath

See also